USCGC Sorrel (WAGL/WLB-296) was a Cactus (A) class buoy tender of the United States Coast Guard built by Zenith Dredge of Duluth, Minnesota. Her keel was laid 26 May 1942, launched 28 September 1942 and commissioned on 15 April 1943.

History

During her tenure in Boston she was used for maintaining navigational aids and ice breaking. On 25 July 1947 she reported to Rockland, Maine and then on 25 October 1948 she returned to Boston where she would remain until 1 May 1954. All during this time of being shuffled between Boston and Rockland, she frequently worked out of Argentia, Newfoundland.

On 8 December 1948 Sorrel freed icebound , on 23–24 October 1950 rescued 8 crew from the motor vessel North Voyager, on 29 November 1951 assisted following collision between motor vessel Ventura and fishing vessel Lynn near Boston, on 20–21 July 1952 towed disabled fishing vessel Richard J. Nunan to Portland, Maine for repairs and on 19 February 1953 towed disabled fishing vessels Geraldine and Phyllis to Boston, Massachusetts for repair.

On 1 May 1954 Sorrel was reassigned to Sitka, Alaska for maintaining navigational aids, search and rescue missions, ice breaking, law and treaty enforcement and enforcement of U.S. territorial waters.  On 12–13 September 1956 assisted fishing vessel Valencia near Sitka, Alaska, on 18 June 1958 assisted fishing vessel Guardian 120 miles west of Sitka, and on 10–11 July 1958 assisted residents at Lituya Bay and Yakutat Bay following an earthquake in the region. On October 22, 1962 Sorrel assisted in the successful rescue of 95 passengers of a Northwest Airlines DC-7C that crashed near Sitka, Alaska.

On 1 July 1965 Sorrel was reassigned to Seward, Alaska where she would remain until 18 April 1973.  On 13 September 1966 assisted towing fishing vessel Jo Ann to Cordova, Alaska, on 6 November 1967 fought a fire at Shelter Cove, Alaska, on 4 November 1969 medevaced two crewman seriously burned in a fire on the Japanese fishing vessel Koshin Maru, and on 21 November 1970 medevaced crewman from fishing vessel Lee Ann to Seward, Alaska for medical aid.

From 18 April 1973 to 31 March 1976 Sorrel was stationed in Cordova, Alaska.  On 31 March 1976 Sorrel left Alaska and reported to the Coast Guard Yard at Curtis Bay, Maryland for major renovation under the Service Life Extension Program (SLEP). Under SLEP, she would get new generator and propulsion systems, navigational electronics, new vang supported boom system (eliminating the distinctive Cactus (A) Class "A" frame boom support), reworked superstructure and renovations to crew's living spaces.

Following SLEP, on 2 December 1982 Sorrel reported to Governor's Island, N.Y. to continue her career as a buoy tender until decommissioned on 20 June 1996. Sorrel was sold and is now the SS Reliance operated by Sea Scout Ship #13 of Stockton, California.  She was used for training cruises to teach seamanship to young men and women.

In 2007, the Reliance was sold to Seaway Trading Inc and renamed Fearless.

References

External links

Cactus-class seagoing buoy tenders
Historic American Engineering Record in New York (state)
1942 ships
Ships built in Duluth, Minnesota